Civil Lines metro station may refer to:

 Civil Lines metro station (Delhi)
 Civil Lines metro station (Jaipur)